The following is a list of notable residents, natives, and persons generally associated with the city of Chester, Pennsylvania, the first city in Pennsylvania.

A 
Al Alberts, lead singer of The Four Aces
Samuel Anderson, U.S. Congressman for Pennsylvania's 4th congressional district
William Anderson, major in the Continental Army and U.S. Congressman

B 
J. Pius Barbour, executive director of the National Baptist Association, mentor to then-college student Martin Luther King Jr.

Thomas N. Barnes, first African-American Chief Master Sergeant of the Air Force
Joseph F. Battle Jr., 25th Mayor of Chester and judge on Delaware County Court of Common Pleas
Ruth L. Bennett, social worker, first president of the Chester branch of the NAACP
William H. Berry, 10th Mayor of Chester and Treasurer of Pennsylvania
Jahlil Beats, music producer
Marcus Belgrave, jazz trumpeter
Ron Bennington, host of XM Satellite Radio program The Ron and Fez Show
Crosby M. Black, Pennsylvania State Representative for Delaware County and 7th Mayor of Chester
Ed Blizzard, prominent pharmaceutical injury attorney
Louis A. Bloom, Pennsylvania State Representative for Delaware County (1947-1952), Judge on Pennsylvania Court of Common Pleas for Delaware County
Barbara Bohannan-Sheppard, 27th Mayor of Chester
Stanley Branche, civil rights leader, founder of the Committee for Freedom Now
Ethel Hampson Brewster, Swarthmore College professor and philologist
Fran Brill, voice actress and Muppeteer
Anna Broomall, obstetrician, surgeon and educator
Wendell Butler Jr., mayor of Chester

C 
George Campbell, soccer player for Atlanta United
Lamar Campbell, former NFL defensive back
Ted Cather, professional baseball player
Dorothy Chacko, social worker, medical doctor, Padma Shri award recipient
E. Wallace Chadwick, U.S. Congressman
Robert Chadwick, Pennsylvania State Representative for Delaware County
Joe Chambers, jazz drummer
Tom Chism, Major League Baseball player
Thomas Clyde, founder of the Clyde Line of steamers

George Clymer, Founding Father of the United States, signer of the United States Declaration of Independence, lived in Chester with his family during the British Army assault on Philadelphia
Joseph R. T. Coates, 5th mayor of Chester and officer in the Union Army during the US Civil War
Audrey B. Collins, United States District Judge
Lawrence A. Conner, Sr., Pennsylvania State Representative for Delaware County (1953-1954)
Ted Cottrell, NFL player and coach
Walter H. Craig, Pennsylvania State Representative for Delaware County (1923-1925), Chester City Council member (1925-1937)
John Price Crozer, textile manufacturer and philanthropist
Helen Curry (1896-1931), stage actress

D 
Clamma Dale, opera singer
Edward Darlington, U.S. Congressman
Ben Davis, Major League Baseball player, Philadelphia Phillies sports announcer
Dux and Julie DeJohn, professional singers

Alfred O. Deshong, industrialist, philanthropist and art collector
John O. Deshong, businessman and banker
Peter Deshong, businessman and banker
Elaine Diacumakos, cell biologist and head of the cytobiology laboratory at Rockefeller University
Franklin Archibald Dick, Missouri provost marshal general
Fred Diodati, lead singer of The Four Aces
Fred Draper, film and television actor
Kathrynann Durham, Pennsylvania State Representative for 160th district (1979-1996) and Judge on Pennsylvania Court of Common Pleas for Delaware County
Jill Duson, lawyer, lobbyist and politician in Maine

E 
Samuel Edwards, U.S. Congressman
Carolyn J. Elmore, Maryland State Representative
Frederick K. Engle, rear admiral of the United States Navy
Theodore Enslin, poet
David Reese Esrey, businessman and banker

Tyreke Evans, professional basketball player

F 
Bill Fleischman (1939–2019), sports journalist and professor
Lenora Fulani, psychologist, psychotherapist and political activist

G 
J. R. Gach, talk radio host
Margaret H. George, Pennsylvania State representative
Fredia Gibbs, martial artist, kickboxer, boxer
James Henry Gorbey, United States federal judge and 25th mayor of Chester
Steve Gordon, screenwriter and film director
Darrin Govens, professional basketball player
Bud Grace, cartoonist
Ralph Greenberg, mathematician
John E. Gremminger, Pennsylvania State Representative
Frank Hastings Griffin, invented rayon manufacturing process

H 
John K. Hagerty, Pennsylvania State Representative for Delaware County (1921-1922), Chester City Council member (1907-1918)

Bill Haley, rock-and-roll musician
Robert Harland, actor
Hubert R. Harmon, first superintendent of the United States Air Force Academy
Herman Harris, professional basketball player
Ron Henry, professional baseball player
John B. Hinkson, lawyer, businessman, 6th mayor of Chester
Rahlir Hollis-Jefferson, professional basketball player
Rondae Hollis-Jefferson, Toronto Raptors forward
John Martin Howard, U.S. Navy officer, mine disposal unit, USS John M. Howard (IX-75) named in his honor
Will Hunter, Minnesota Vikings safety and Syracuse University standout

J 
E. W. Jackson, Virginia politician and Christian minister 
Derrick Jones Jr., Portland Trail Blazers forward
Edmund Jones, Pennsylvania State Representative
Kevin Jones, Chicago Bears running back and former Virginia Tech football standout

K 
John Ernst Worrell Keely, con man, inventor of the Keely Motor
Muhammad Kenyatta, civil rights leader
Lisa Kereszi, photographer
Brian Joseph Kirkland, Pennsylvania State Representative
Thaddeus Kirkland, Pennsylvania State Representative, 32nd Mayor of Chester
Joe Klecko, lineman with New York Jets and Temple University; father of Dan Klecko of New England Patriots, Indianapolis Colts, Philadelphia Eagles

Mignonette Kokin, vaudeville dancer, comedian
Lew Krausse Jr., professional baseball player
Bob Kuberski, football player for Green Bay Packers

L 
Bob Lamey, radio announcer, play-by-play announcer for the Indianapolis Colts
John Larkin, Jr., businessman, banker and first mayor of Chester
Willie Mae James Leake, first African-American and female Mayor of Chester
John Linder, 31st Mayor of Chester
John Linehan, assistant basketball coach for the Saint Joseph's Hawks
David Lloyd, Attorney General of Pennsylvania, six-term Speaker of the Pennsylvania General Assembly, Chief Justice of the Pennsylvania Supreme Court

M 

John J. McClure, Pennsylvania State Senator and leader of Delaware County Republican political machine
Lee McLaughlin, film and television actor
Kevin Michael, soul singer
Nicholas K. Miller, middle guard, and defensive MVP for Ohio State Buckeyes
John Mobley, Denver Broncos linebacker and former Kutztown University football standout
Sylvanus Morley, archaeologist and Mayanist scholar
Charles Morris, journalist and author
John Morton, Founding Father of the United States, cast a key vote on the Declaration of Independence.  Buried in Chester.
Danny Murtaugh, manager of Pittsburgh Pirates who guided team to World Series titles in 1960 and 1971

N 
John H. Nacrelli, 24th Mayor of Chester, convicted of racketeering and bribery
Jameer Nelson, professional basketball player
Alex North, composer, 15-time Academy Award nominee
Edward Nothnagle, Pennsylvania State Representative for Delaware County (1926-1936), Chester City Council member

O 
Curly Ogden, professional baseball player
Jack Ogden, professional baseball player
Donnie Owens, singer, guitarist, producer and composer

P 
John M. Paxton, Jr., United States Marine Corps general officer
Dominic Pileggi, Pennsylvania State Senator
Johnny Podgajny, professional baseball player
Rudy Pompilli, saxophonist with Bill Haley and the Comets

David Dixon Porter, leading officer and reformer in the U.S. Navy during the American Civil War 
William D. Porter, flag officer in the U.S. Navy
William G. Price Jr., commander of the Pennsylvania National Guard's 28th Infantry Division
Joe Pyne, radio and TV talk show host
Caleb Pusey, early settler of Chester, friend and business partner of William Penn

R 
William T. Ramsey, Pennsylvania State Representative and 16th mayor of Chester
George Raymond, president of NAACP Chester branch from 1942 to 1977
Ronald C. Raymond, Pennsylvania state representative
Bertice Reading, actress, singer, revue artiste
James W. Reese, U.S. Army Medal of Honor recipient in World War II
 John Roach, industrialist and shipbuilder
V. Gilpin Robinson, Pennsylvania State Representative
Bo Ryan, former head coach of Wisconsin Badgers men's basketball team, coached UW-Platteville to four NCAA Division III national championships
Matthew Ryan, singer-songwriter

S 
William I. Schaffer, Pennsylvania Attorney General
Josiah Sleeper, founder of Sleeper's College
Jerome Smith, professional football player
James Ross Snowden (1809-1878), 67th Speaker of the Pennsylvania House of Representatives, Director of the U.S. Mint
Dawn Sowell, professional Track and Field athlete
William Cameron Sproul, 27th Governor of Pennsylvania
Brent Staples, editorial writer for the New York Times
Joey Stefano, pornographic actor

AverySunshine, soul singer

T 
Robin Toner, national political correspondent for the New York Times
David Trainer, textile manufacturer and banker
Anthony Tucker, also known as The Beat Bully, record producer and songwriter
Ellwood J. Turner, Pennsylvania State Representative for Delaware County (1925-1948), 119th Speaker of the Pennsylvania House of Representatives (1939-1941)

W 
Horace Walker, professional basketball player
Young Singleton Walter, Pennsylvania State Representative and owner of the Delaware County Republican newspaper
William Ward, U.S. Congressman
William Ward Jr., Pennsylvania State Representative and two term mayor of Chester

Ethel Waters, Grammy-winning blues recording artist, Broadway performer, Academy Award nominee for Pinky (1949)
George Watkins, U.S. Congressman
Brandi Wells, singer-songwriter
Eleanor D. Wilson, Tony-nominated actress and artist
Stephen M. Wolownik, Russian and Eastern European musician
Jonathan Edwards Woodbridge, shipbuilder and naval architect
Thomas Worrilow, Pennsylvania State Representative
Robert C. Wright, Pennsylvania State Representative

References
References are on the article pages if not listed here.

Chester
Chester